The Dickie Hills,  el. , is a small mountain range northwest of Wise River, Montana in Silver Bow County, Montana.

See also
 List of mountain ranges in Montana

Notes

Mountain ranges of Montana
Landforms of Silver Bow County, Montana